In mathematics, a polylogarithmic function in  is a polynomial in the logarithm of ,

 

In computer science, polylogarithmic functions occur as the order of time or memory used by some algorithms (e.g., "it has polylogarithmic order").

This observation is the basis for the soft O notation .

References 
 

Mathematical analysis
Polynomials
Analysis of algorithms